Golden Temple Vellore complex inside the Thirupuram spiritual park is situated at the foot of a small range of green hills at Thirumalaikodi (or simply Malaikodi) Vellore in Tamil Nadu, India. It is 120 km from Tirupati, 145 km from Chennai, 160 km from Pondicherry and 200 km from Bengaluru. The Maha Kumbhabhishekam or consecration of the temple and its chief deity, Sri Lakshmi Narayani or Maha Lakshmi, the goddess of wealth, was held on 24 August 2007, and devotees from all religions and backgrounds are welcome to visit.

Background 
The salient feature of 'Thirupuram' is the Lakshmi Narayani temple whose Vimanam and Ardha Mandapam is covered with pure gold, housing the deity Sri Lakshmi Narayani (female consort/wife of Vishnu Narayana). The temple is located on 100 acres of land and has been constructed by the Vellore-based charitable trust, Sri Narayani Peedam, headed by its spiritual leader Sri Sakthi Amma also known as 'Narayani Amma'.

Design 
The temple with its gold covering, has intricate work done by artisans specialising in temple art using gold. Every single detail was manually created, including converting the gold bars into gold foils and then mounting the foils on copper. Gold foil from 9 layers to 10 layers has been mounted on the etched copper plates. Every single detail in the temple art has significance from the Vedas.

Sripuram's design features a star-shaped path (Sri chakra), positioned in the middle of the lush green landscape, with a length of over 1.8 km. As one walks along this 'starpath' to reach the temple in the middle, one can also read various spiritual messages -- such as the gift of the human birth itself, and the value of spirituality -- along the way.

Hospital
The Sri Narayani Hospital & Research Centre is a general hospital located near the Thirupuram temple complex and is also run by the 'Sri Narayani Peedam' Charitable Trust.

Gallery

See also
 Vellore Fort
 Golden Temple - Sikh temple in Amritsar

References

External links 

 The official website of Sripuram
Tourist attractions in Vellore
Neighbourhoods in Vellore
Hindu temples in Vellore district
Silver-gilt objects
Gold sculptures
Lakshmi temples
 Golden Temple Vellore